The Geoemydinae are a subfamily of turtles consisting of 60 subspecies and 76 taxa.

These genera are placed here:
  Batagur (six species, including part of Kachuga)
 Chinemys (three species) (sometimes included in Mauremys)
 Cuora (10-11 species) (including Cistoclemmys)
 Cyclemys (seven species)
 Geoemyda (two species)
 Hardella (monotypic)
 Heosemys (formerly in Geoemyda)
 Hieremys  (formerly in Geoemyda, often included in Heosemys)
 Leucocephalon (monotypic) (formerly in Geoemyda and Heosemys)
 Malayemys (two species)
 Mauremys (including Annamemys, Cathaiemys and Emmenia)
 Melanochelys
 Morenia (two species)
 Notochelys
 Ocadia (monotypic), historic genera included in Mauremys
 Orlitia (monotypic)
 Pangshura (four species)
 Pyxidea (monotypic) (often included in Cuora)
 Sacalia (two species)
 Siebenrockiella (two species) (formerly in Geoemyda and Heosemys, includes Panayanemys)
 Vijayachelys (monotypic) (formerly in Geoemyda and Heosemys)

References

Bibliography

 Geoemydidae

Geoemydidae